St. Joe Lead Company Administration Building, also known as the St. Joe Company Offices, Central Office Building, is a historic office building located at Bonne Terre, St. Francois County, Missouri.  It was built in 1909 by the St. Joe Lead Company, and is a 2 1/2-story, "H"-shaped, Gothic Revival style brick building with granite trim.  It features pointed arched entrances, bay windows and bi-chromatic decoration.

It was added to the National Register of Historic Places in 1984.

References

Office buildings on the National Register of Historic Places in Missouri
Gothic Revival architecture in Missouri
Commercial buildings completed in 1909
Buildings and structures in St. Francois County, Missouri
National Register of Historic Places in St. Francois County, Missouri